Rameswarpur is a census town within the jurisdiction of the Maheshtala police station in the Thakurpukur Maheshtala CD block in the Alipore Sadar subdivision of the South 24 Parganas district in the Indian state of West Bengal.

Geography

Area overview
Alipore Sadar subdivision is the most urbanized part of the South 24 Parganas district. 59.85% of the population lives in the urban areas and 40.15% lives in the rural areas. In the northern portion of the subdivision (shown in the map alongside) there are 21 census towns. The entire district is situated in the Ganges Delta and the subdivision, on the east bank of the Hooghly River, is an alluvial stretch, with industrial development.

Note: The map alongside presents some of the notable locations in the subdivision. All places marked in the map are linked in the larger full screen map.

Location

Rameswarpur, Chata Kalikapur, Ganye Gangadharpur and Asuti  form a cluster of census towns on the southern side of Maheshtala, as per the map of the Thakurpukur Maheshtala CD block on page 153 of the District Census Handbook 2011 for the South 24 Parganas.

Demographics
According to the 2011 Census of India, Rameswarpur had a total population of 7,200, of which 3,738 (52%) were males and 3,642 (48%) were females. There were 814 persons in the age range of 0 to 6 years. The total number of literate people in Rameswarpur was 4,999 (78.28% of the population over 6 years).

Infrastructure
According to the District Census Handbook 2011, Rameswarpur covered an area of 2.3248 km2. Nangi railway station is 3 km away. Among the civic amenities it had 5 km of roads with both open and covered drains. The source of protected water supply was borewell tank and overhead tank. It had 950 domestic electric connections and 150 road lights. Among the medical facilities it had was a nursing home 3 km away. Among the educational facilities it had were 2 primary schools, 1 middle school, 1 secondary school and the nearest general degree college was at Maheshtala 5 km away. Among the social, recreational and cultural facilities, the nearest public library was at Chattan 3 km away. The nearest cinema theatre was at Maheshtala 3 km away. Three important commodities manufactured were: garments, dyeing and cotton spinning.

Transport
A short stretch of local roads link Rameswarpur to the Budge Budge Trunk Road.

Nangi railway station is located nearby.

Healthcare
Sarsuna Block Primary Health Centre, with 15 beds, at Sarsuna, is the major government medical facility in the Thakurpukur Maheshtala CD block.

References

Cities and towns in South 24 Parganas district
Neighbourhoods in Kolkata
Kolkata Metropolitan Area